The Eastern, formerly known as Walter Tower, is the 4th tallest skyscraper in the city of Raleigh, North Carolina, United States. Upon completion, the tower became the 31st tallest in North Carolina, and the 8th tallest in North Carolina outside of Charlotte, North Carolina.

Developed by Kane Realty, The Eastern is also the tallest residential building in Raleigh. It contains 376 residential units, which range from studios to three-bedroom units. The top three floors contain penthouse units.

See also
 List of tallest buildings in Raleigh, North Carolina
 List of tallest buildings in North Carolina

References

Buildings and structures in Raleigh, North Carolina